Jang Hyun-seung (born September 3, 1989) most often credited as  Hyunseung, is a South Korean singer. He is best known as a former member of the boy group Beast. With Beast, he has released singles and albums in both Korean and Japanese. Beast won the Artist of the Year (Daesang) award at the Melon Music Awards in 2011.

Hyunseung was also one half of the duo Trouble Maker with former Cube label mate, Hyuna. In December 2011, the duo released their debut extended play with the lead single, "Trouble Maker."

Family and personal life
Hyunseung was raised in Seoul, South Korea. He has a younger sister named Jang Geu-rim. His father died in 2012 from a sudden heart attack.

In 2010, Hyunseung was reported to be attending Dongshin University under a full scholarship, along with four other members of Beast. He was majoring in Applied Music. In 2019, his university degree was revoked by the Ministry of Education following investigation into universities’ special treatment for celebrities.

Career

Pre-debut
In 2004, at the age of 15, Hyunseung took part in auditions for YG Entertainment. He was eliminated in the second round, but went to see CEO Yang Hyun-suk afterwards out of frustration at being eliminated and was accepted as a trainee.

For a year and four months, Hyunseung was a trainee for the boy group Big Bang. During this time, he used the stage name "So-1," a homonym for the Korean word for wish. He first gained media attention when he appeared in the group's pre-debut "Big Bang Documentary," along with members G-Dragon, T.O.P, Taeyang, Daesung and Seungri. He appeared in 10 out of 11 episodes, but was cut from the group in a final elimination round with Seungri. Yang Hyun-suk said that Hyunseung's expressiveness and stage presence were underdeveloped at the time. Fellow Beast member, Yoon Doo-joon decided to become a singer after watching the BigBang documentary featuring Hyunseung. Hyunseung refers to his experiences at YG as important to his development as an artist.

Hyunseung later met future fellow band member Yang Yo-seob while they were working as dancers for a show performance team. Yoseob convinced Hyunseung to join Cube Entertainment, leading to him debuting with Beast.

Beast 

The group has released 3 Korean albums, 9 Korean extended plays and various singles. In December 2010, Hyunseung teamed up with fellow member Lee Gi-kwang in a sub-unit to write and compose an R&B track as part of the group's digital album, My Story.

Solo activities 
On May 7, 2015, Hyunseung released his solo debut extended play, My. Other than BEAST's tracks, Hyunseung's album had more influences on hip-hop culture and pop culture in his preference, such as title track "Ma First" featuring Giriboy and "Break Up With Him" featuring Dok2.

Trouble Maker 

In December 2011, Hyunseung formed a unit with label mate 4Minute's Hyuna called Trouble Maker. Trouble Maker debuted with their self-named lead single and extended play, Trouble Maker. On October 28, 2013, the group released their second extended play, Chemistry.

Musical career 
Hyunseung made his acting debut in the musical Mozart!. He performed as the main character from late July 2012 to early August 2012 at the Sejong Center.

In April 2014, Hyunseung was cast in the musical Bonnie & Clyde. He performed as the lead character, Clyde, from April 15 to June 29, 2014 at the BBC Art Center along with other artists, including SHINee‘s Key, ZE:A‘s Park Hyung Sik, Kahi, and Oh So Yeon.

In April 2016, Hyunseung was nominated and won "Best Male Artist (South Korea)" at the 4th Annual V-Chart Music Awards in China.

Departure from Beast 
On April 19, 2016, Cube Entertainment announced he officially left Beast to continue as a soloist.

On July 29, 2016, Cube Entertainment announced that Hyunseung would be joining the dance competition program Hit The Stage, making it his first broadcast appearance since leaving Beast.

On December 13, 2016, it was confirmed that Hyunseung had renewed his exclusive contract with Cube Entertainment.

On June 12, 2018, it was confirmed that Hyunseung will enlist in the military on July 24 as an active soldier.  He was discharged from the military on 13 March 2020.

In December 2020, Hyunseung is set to release a song digitally, titled "I want to wrap your cold hands warmly". This is his first activity after his discharge in military service in March. On December 17 2020, the song was released on digital charts and YouTube called "I Just Can't Stop Loving You (Korean title: 차가운 너의 손을 따스히 감싸주고 싶어).

On August 3, 2021, Hyunseung's exclusive contract with Cube Entertainment has expired.

Mine Field 

As of September 2022, Hyunseung is signed to label Mine Field under the stage name 'ABLE'.

Discography

Extended plays

Singles

Other charted songs

Features & OST

Filmography

Web shows

Awards and nominations

Notes

References

External links

 

Cube Entertainment artists
Highlight (band) members
1989 births
South Korean rhythm and blues singers
K-pop singers
Living people
People from Suncheon
South Korean male singers
South Korean pop singers
South Korean male idols
South Korean hip hop singers
21st-century South Korean singers